Frank Chesworth (1873 Q4–1907) was an English footballer who played in the Football League for Glossop and Stockport County.

References

1873 births
1907 deaths
English footballers
Association football forwards
English Football League players
Nantwich Town F.C. players
Stockport County F.C. players
Glossop North End A.F.C. players
Witton Albion F.C. players